The Russian route A147 is a Russian federal highway, a mountain highway that runs along the coast of the Black Sea in Krasnodar Krai from Novorossiysk through Gelendzhik, Tuapse, and Greater Sochi to Adler. The road terminates at Russia's border with Abkhazia/Georgia. 

Further south, the route continues as the S1 across Abkhazia to Sukhumi. The Soviet motorway M27 continued even further south, traversing all of Georgia (including the capital Tbilisi) and terminating at Baku, the capital of Azerbaijan.

Until 2018, the A147 was designated as M27.

Gallery

References

Transport in Krasnodar Krai
Roads in Russia